Le Bonheur Children's Hospital is a 255-bed, tertiary care children's hospital located in Downtown Memphis, Tennessee. Le Bonheur has more than 700 medical staff representing 40 pediatric specialties. Approximately 170 patients per day are admitted, mostly from Tennessee and nearby states but also from around the world, mainly due to its nationally recognized brain tumor program, affiliation with St. Jude Children's Research Hospital and for being the home of the Children's Foundation Research Center. The hospital treats infants, children, teens, and young adults aged 0–21.

Le Bonheur functions as the region's primary level 1 pediatric trauma center. The hospital cares for 14,000 patients every year, including about 81,000 visits to the emergency department a year and 8,800 surgeries per year. Le Bonheur also serves as a teaching hospital affiliated with the University of Tennessee Health Science Center and offers training in general pediatrics and pediatric subspecialties.

History
Le Bonheur was founded on June 15, 1952, by the Le Bonheur Club, originally a women's sewing circle, and was originally an orphanage dedicated to caring for poor children. The Le Bonheur Club members raised all of the money for the initial investment for the hospital.  When the doors opened, the Le Bonheur Club President, Mrs. Howard Pritchard, stated: "The doors of Le Bonheur will never be found closed and will forever hereafter be open to those who come in need, seeking its help." The medical center has gone through two major expansion projects.

When Hurricane Katrina first hit New Orleans in August 2005, Le Bonheur (along with other hospitals) sent helicopters to Tulane Medical Center, Ochsner, and CHNOLA in order to help evacuate pediatric patients from the hospital.

In February 2008, ground was broken on the new expansion by Le Bonheur executives.  In December 2010, Le Bonheur Children's Hospital opened the emergency department in its newly renovated 12-story patient care tower. Le Bonheur maintains two ambulances equipped for critical care transport.

Methodist Le Bonheur Healthcare 
In 1995, Le Bonheur became a part of the Methodist Healthcare System, which is supported by the Memphis, Mississippi and Arkansas conferences of The United Methodist Church. While it is primarily located in Memphis, the system also owns the Methodist Olive Branch hospital in Mississippi.

The healthcare system began in 1918 with a farmer named John Sherard.

Collection practices 
Like the other 2 major systems in the region, the parent company filed collections actions against patients who have difficulty paying, with 8,300 lawsuits between 2014 and 2018. This practice ended soon after and was reversed by erasing millions in patient debt.

Education
Le Bonheur is affiliated with the University of Tennessee Health Science Center and St. Jude Children's Research Hospital. It offers training in general pediatrics and several subspecialty areas of pediatrics. Le Bonheur Children's Hospital has been ranked among the nation's best by U.S. News & World Report in different specialties.

References

External links
 Le Bonheur Children's Hospital
 Children's Foundation Research Center
 University of Tennessee Health Science Center
 St. Jude Children's Research Hospital

Hospital buildings completed in 1952
Children's hospitals in the United States
Hospitals in Memphis, Tennessee
Teaching hospitals in Tennessee
Pediatric trauma centers
Hospitals established in 1952